Venango Township is the name of some places in the U.S. state of Pennsylvania:

Venango Township, Butler County, Pennsylvania
Venango Township, Crawford County, Pennsylvania
Venango Township, Erie County, Pennsylvania

Pennsylvania township disambiguation pages